7 Television Commercials is a collection of music videos by the English rock band Radiohead, covering the period from The Bends (1995) to OK Computer (1997).

Release
The VHS home video was released on 4 May 1998 in the United Kingdom, and on 30 June in the United States. The DVD was released on 4 August 2003 in the UK and 5 August in North America.

Music videos

"Paranoid Android"
"Street Spirit (Fade Out)"
"No Surprises"
"Just"
"High and Dry" (U.S. version)
"Karma Police"
"Fake Plastic Trees"

Critical reception
7 Television Commercials received mixed reviews from critics. Reviewer Ian Reed felt that "it could have been better". Reed also commented on the duration of the video, just over 30 minutes, only seven music videos.

Christian Hoard of Rolling Stone gave the re-release collection of videos 2 out of 4 stars, also mentioning the length of the release: "Why only seven? And no bonus material? You'd think that a band as wary of commercial exploitation as Radiohead wouldn't ask fans to shell out for so slight a souvenir."

Personnel
All videos commissioned by Dilly Gent.

Packaging art and design by Stanley Donwood and The White Chocolate Farm.

"Paranoid Android"Director: Magnus CarlssonProducer: Peter GustaffsonProduction company: Wegelius Animation AB
"Street Spirit (Fade Out)"Director: Jonathan GlazerProducer: Nick MorrisCinematography: Steve Keith-RoachProduction company: Academy Music Video Ltd
"No Surprises"Director: Grant GeeProducer: Phil BarnesCinematography: Dan LandinProduction company: Kudos (Music Video)
"Just"Director: Jamie ThravesProducer: Niki AmosCinematography: Alexander SeligmanProduction company: Oil Factory Inc
"High and Dry" (U.S. version)Director: Paul Cunningham Producer: Myke ZykoffCinematography: Adam BeckmanProduction company: Oil Factory Inc
"Karma Police"Director: Jonathan GlazerProducer: Nick MorrisCinematography: Steve Keith-RoachProduction company: Academy Music Video Ltd
"Fake Plastic Trees"Director: Jake ScottProducer: Ellen JacobsonCinematography: Salvatore TotinoProduction company: Black Dog Films (LA)

References

Radiohead video albums
1998 video albums
Music video compilation albums
1998 compilation albums
Radiohead compilation albums
Parlophone compilation albums
Parlophone video albums